Rhaldney Norberto Simião Gomes (born 20 November 1998), simply known as Rhaldney, is a Brazilian footballer who plays as a midfielder for Atlético Goianiense.

Club career

Náutico
Born in Recife, Pernambuco, Rhaldney joined Náutico's youth setup at the age of 13. He made his first team debut on 22 January 2019, starting in a 2–0 away win over Sergipe, for the year's Copa do Nordeste.

After only two first team appearances during the season, as the club achieved promotion to the Série B, Rhaldney was definitely promoted to the main squad for the 2020 campaign. On 25 April 2020, he renewed his contract with the club.

Rhaldney scored his first professional goal on 12 September 2020, netting his team's third in a 3–1 home win over Botafogo-SP.

Atlético Goianiense
On 11 July 2022, Náutico announced the transfer of Rhaldney to Série A side Atlético Goianiense, for a rumoured fee of R$ 1 million.

Career statistics

Honours
Náutico
Campeonato Brasileiro Série C: 2019
Campeonato Pernambucano: 2021, 2022

References

1998 births
Living people
Sportspeople from Recife
Brazilian footballers
Association football midfielders
Campeonato Brasileiro Série A players
Campeonato Brasileiro Série B players
Campeonato Brasileiro Série C players
Clube Náutico Capibaribe players
Atlético Clube Goianiense players